White Mountain is a  mountain summit located in the Olympic Mountains, in Jefferson County of Washington state. Situated in Olympic National Park, its nearest higher peak is Mount La Crosse,  to the northeast, and an unnamed glacier lies in the north cirque between the two peaks. Precipitation runoff from the mountain drains into tributaries of the Quinault River and Duckabush River.

Climate

Based on the Köppen climate classification, White Mountain is located in the marine west coast climate zone of western North America. Most weather fronts originate in the Pacific Ocean, and travel northeast toward the Olympic Mountains. As fronts approach, they are forced upward by the peaks of the Olympic Range, causing them to drop their moisture in the form of rain or snowfall (Orographic lift). As a result, the Olympics experience high precipitation, especially during the winter months. During winter months, weather is usually cloudy, but, due to high pressure systems over the Pacific Ocean that intensify during summer months, there is often little or no cloud cover during the summer. In terms of favorable weather, June to September are the best months for climbing the mountain.

Geology

The Olympic Mountains are composed of obducted clastic wedge material and oceanic crust, primarily Eocene sandstone, turbidite, and basaltic oceanic crust. The mountains were sculpted during the Pleistocene era by erosion and glaciers advancing and retreating multiple times.

See also

 Olympic Mountains
 Geology of the Pacific Northwest
 Geography of Washington (state)

References

External links
 White Mountain Weather forecast

Olympic Mountains
Mountains of Jefferson County, Washington
Mountains of Washington (state)
Landforms of Olympic National Park